Richard Dease ( - 21 February 1819) was the president of the Royal College of Surgeons in Ireland (RCSI) in 1809.

Richard Dease was born in Dublin about the year 1774. His father was William Dease, the eminent surgeon, one of the founders of the Royal College of Surgeons in Ireland. Richard Dease was educated in Trinity College, and graduated B.A. in 1794. Having been indentured to his father on 1 September 1790, he prosecuted his medical studies in the RCSI and the Meath Hospital. He also spent some time in the London hospitals and at Edinburgh University, in which he graduated M.D. On 3 September 1795, he obtained the Letters Testimonial of RCSI and in the same year succeeded Israel Read as Surgeon to the Meath Hospital. On 12 September, and only nine days after passing as a licentiate, he was elected a member of the College, and on the death of his father he succeeded him in the Chairs of Anatomy and Surgery in the College School. Dease was a thoroughly educated man, an accomplished anatomist, and a very skilful surgeon.

On Saturday, 13 February 1819, Dease was lecturing to his class on the cervical nerves and brachial plexus. The subject was a woman who had been dead less than forty-eight hours, and who had died from a pulmonary affection. He appears to have had his skin very slightly abraded during the demonstration. The next morning he awoke early very ill, having violent shivering and a sick stomach. He soon developed the most severe symptoms of blood poisoning, and died on 21 February, in the house in Sackville street which he had inherited from his father.

See also
 List of presidents of the Royal College of Surgeons in Ireland

References 

Presidents of the Royal College of Surgeons in Ireland
Irish surgeons
1770s births
1819 deaths
Year of birth uncertain